William York Wray (born March 24, 1956), known professionally as Bill Wray, is an American cartoonist, animator and landscape painter widely known for his contributions to Mad and The Ren & Stimpy Show, as well as his current focus on regional landscape painting—under the names Bill Wray for his animated work and William Wray for his paintings.

With urban landscapes, cartoon elements, and superheroes as frequent subjects, Wray is noted for a tightly cropped and abstract painting style. The Huffington Post said he "has a brisk, bold style that gives his city scenes a jolt of painterly drama." Southwest Art Magazine called him "a chronicler of the fading urban remains of a bygone era."

Early life
Wray was the son of a lieutenant colonel in Army intelligence, and his family moved frequently, living in Germany, Vietnam, and Hong Kong. He often read comic books and watched animated cartoons. In 2009, he said, "I was always drawing because I was lonely."

When he was 10, his family settled in Costa Mesa, California. After high school, he attended Orange Coast College, but dropped out to animate professionally during the day and study art privately weekends and nights with a retired Disney animator. He subsequently animated for Disney, Hanna-Barbera and Filmation.

Career
In 1985, Wray moved to New York, doing comic-book work for Marvel and DC Comics while studying at New York's Art Students League. A phone call from John Kricfalusi brought him back West in the early 1990s to work on The Ren & Stimpy Show, Samurai Jack, The Mighty B! and other shows. Since 2010, Wray has worked with Rauch Brothers Animation on animated shorts for StoryCorps.

His long-run Monroe series appeared in more than 100 issues of Mad, and he has also co-created Dark Horse Comics Hellboy Junior with Mike Mignola based on the Hellboy character. His cartoon influences include Hank Ketcham, Harvey Kurtzman, Erich Sokol and Wally Wood.

Wray now concentrates on landscape oil paintings of landscapes, figures, and urban settings. Wray has said his attitude and approach to his paintings is an attempt to document aspects of urban California that continue to vanish:
The highest compliment I ever received was when a great painter told me my paintings look old. I love the early 20th Century's art and architecture and work hard to invoke comparisons to that period in my work. I love the idea of capturing what's left of a bygone era; recording it before it's gone, replaced by a new strip mall. I've spent my life studying the artists of that era, reaching for a level of skill and feeling that the modern art world has long dismissed as dull-witted craft. I hope my paintings of these old structures has become less an invocation of nostalgia than an important race to record what is fast disappearing. Every time you find an old factory, a rundown dock or an old shack, a developer is sure to be there trying to convince the city it's time to renovate. Good for the economy, they say, but bad for the painter looking for interesting subjects to paint. California's urban pockets of age are disappearing at a record pace, so I have to paint as fast as I can.

Wray's approach to painting was influenced by Edgar Alwin Payne, Emile Gruppe, J. C. Leyendecker and other artists. He is a member of Laguna Plein Air Painters Association, Oil Painters of America and the California Art Club — and has participated in workshops with Ray Roberts, Carolyn Anderson, Matt Smith, Eric Merrill, Frank Serrano and George Strickland, in addition to his long-term study with Jove Wang.

Awards
2005: First prize winner in Art Interview - International Online Artist Competition.
2005: Second place: 1st Annual 2005 Riverside Plein Air Paint-out
2006: Artist Choice Award at the SLO Painting Festival

References

External links

 William Wray Official site
 Big Blown Baby Official site, Bill Wray cartoonist
 Blog, William Wray
Complete list of Wray's work for MAD Magazine
 Mad About Cartoons
 Online exhibit: William Wray
 Michael Newberry's analysis of Wray's paintings

American cartoonists
American comics artists
Animators from Maryland
Spümcø
20th-century American painters
20th-century American male artists
American male painters
21st-century American painters
21st-century American male artists
Landscape artists
Living people
Mad (magazine) cartoonists
1956 births